Partners of the Plains is a 1938 American Western film directed by Lesley Selander and written by Harrison Jacobs. The film stars William Boyd, Russell Hayden, Harvey Clark, Gwen Gaze, Hilda Plowright and John Warburton. The film was released on January 28, 1938, by Paramount Pictures.

Plot

Lorna Drake (Gwen Gaze), is an aristocratic British girl and Hoppy's (William Boyd) new employer. When Cassidy refuses to be ordered, Lorna has him arrested for horse stealing. The dumbfounded sheriff (Earle Hodgins) is even more puzzled when Miss Drake turns right around and demands that Hoppy be released into her custody.

Cast
 William Boyd as Hopalong Cassidy
 Russell Hayden as Lucky Jenkins
 Harvey Clark as Baldy Morton
 Gwen Gaze as Lorna Drake
 Hilda Plowright as Aunt Martha
 John Warburton as Ronald Harwood
 Al Bridge as Scar Lewis
 Al Hill as Doc Galer
 Earle Hodgins as Sheriff 
 John Beach as Mr. Benson

References

External links 
 
 
 
 

1938 films
1930s English-language films
American Western (genre) films
1938 Western (genre) films
Paramount Pictures films
Films directed by Lesley Selander
Hopalong Cassidy films
American black-and-white films
1930s American films